The discography of Gojira, a French heavy metal band, consists of seven studio albums, three live albums, one film score album (live), four demo albums, one extended plays, ten singles, seventeen music videos, and three video albums.

Gojira was formed in 1996 under the name Godzilla by guitarist Joe Duplantier, his brother, drummer Mario Duplantier, guitarist Christian Andreu, and bassist Alexandre Cornillon. Jean-Michel Labadie replaced Cornillon in 1998. Godzilla released a series of demos from 1996 to 2000. 

The band changed their name to Gojira due to legal reasons in 2001, and released their first full-length album, Terra Incognita, in March 2001 through Gabriel Editions (themselves). Gojira then signed with Boycott Records for their second studio album, The Link, in April 2003, and their first live DVD, The Link Alive, in 2004, which was also released as a live album. 

In September 2005, Gojira released their third album, From Mars to Sirius through Mon Slip, which was later released worldwide via Prosthetic Records. From Mars to Sirius was Gojira's first album to appear on any country's record chart, debuting at No. 44 in France. It remained on the chart for three weeks. After extensive world touring, the band released their fourth album The Way of All Flesh in October 2008, which debuted and peaked at No. 138 on the Billboard 200 chart in the United States, No. 25 in Finland and No. 28 in France.

Gojira signed to Roadrunner Records in 2011 and released their fifth album L'Enfant Sauvage, in June 2012, alongside their second live album/DVD/Blu-ray, The Flesh Alive. L'Enfant Sauvage reached No. 34 on the Billboard 200 chart and entered the Top 40 albums chart in six European countries. In 2014, the band released a live CD/DVD titled, Les Enfants Sauvages. Gojira's sixth studio album, Magma, was released in June 2016. The album debuted at No. 24  on the US Billboard 200 chart and topped the Billboard Hard Rock Albums chart for one week. The album landed in the Top 40 albums chart in twelve European countries. Within eight months, Magma reached the bar of 400,000 albums sold worldwide.

The band's seventh studio album, Fortitude, was released in April 2021 under Roadrunner, and increased Magmas sales and chart positions. The album entered the US Billboard 200 chart at No. 12 and landed the top spot on Billboards Top Album Sales chart, leading nine new releases. It topped the Billboard  Top Rock Albums chart and Hard Rock Albums chart (for a second time after Magma). In terms of pure album sales, Fortitude was the best-selling album in the United States during its first week of release.

Albums

Studio albums

Live albums

Film score albums

Demo albums

Extended plays

Singles

Videos

Music videos

Video albums

References

Heavy metal group discographies
 
Discographies of French artists